Thaddäus-Troll-Preis is a literary prize awarded by the Förderkreis deutscher Schriftsteller in Baden-Württemberg, an organization that supports and sponsors writers in the German state of Baden-Württemberg. The prize is awarded annually to German-language writers resident in the state and is named in honor of  Thaddäus Troll, one of the founders of the organization. The prize money is €10,000.

Winners 
Source:

1981 Manfred Esser
1982 Katja Behrens
1983 Michael Spohn
1984 Rainer Wochele
1985 Gerhard Raff
1986 Rafik Schami
1987 Ernst Köhler (writer)
1988 Carmen Kotarski
1989 Eva Christina Zeller
1990 Hellmut G. Haasis
1991 Urs M. Fiechtner
1992 Thommie Bayer
1993 Harald Hurst
1994 Walle Sayer
1995 Michael Buselmeier
1996 Arnold Stadler
1997 Marcus Hammerschmitt
1998 Markus R. Weber
1999 Karl-Heinz Ott
2000 Joachim Zelter
2001 Anna Breitenbach
2003 Martin Gülich
2005 Angelika Overath
2007 Susanne Stephan
2008 Annette Pehnt
2009 José F. A. Oliver
2010 Martin von Arndt
2011 Lisa-Marie Dickreiter
2012 Sandra Hoffmann
2013 Matthias Kehle
2014 Katrin Zipse
2015 Carolin Callies
2016 Felicitas Andresen
2017 Manuela Fuelle
2018 Kai Wieland
2019 Iris Wolff
2020 Kai Weyand

References

External links
 

Literary awards of Baden-Württemberg